Roger Buchonnet (3 May 1926 – 3 March 2001) was a French racing cyclist. He rode in the 1949 Tour de France and the 1952 Tour de France.

References

External links
 

1926 births
2001 deaths
French male cyclists
Sportspeople from Allier
Cyclists from Auvergne-Rhône-Alpes